Pilocrocis lactealis is a moth in the family Crambidae. It was described by George Hampson in 1912. It is found in Brazil.

The wingspan is about 32 mm. Adults are yellowish white. The costa of the forewings is slightly tinged with fulvous at the base and the veins have slight dark streaks.

References

Pilocrocis
Moths described in 1912
Moths of South America